Steffi Duna (born Erzsébet Berindey; 8 February 1910 – 22 April 1992) was a Hungarian-born film actress.

Hungarian dancer
Born in the Eastern name order in Budapest of Czech extraction and nicknamed Stefi (Stefánia) by her friends and family, Duna started dancing at the age of nine and first attracted attention as a thirteen-year-old ballet dancer in Europe. She made her first stage appearance in dramatized fairy tales at the Children's Theater of Budapest. Initially opposed to the idea, her father sent her to the best schools in the Hungarian capital to learn dancing, and soon she had danced in most of the capitals of Europe.
In 1932, she appeared on the London stage in Noël Coward's revue Words and Music as one of the four actresses to create the song "Mad about the Boy".

Movie actress
When she came to Hollywood in 1932, Duna could not speak a word of English. She made up her mind to learn quickly. Directors advised her to stay away from her Hungarian friends to speed up her learning. Within a few years, she could speak not only English but five other languages. During the 1930s, she played a variety of nationalities. However, despite her European background, she was often cast as fiery Latin femmes fatales in films that made full use of her exotic and glamorous persona, such as La Cucaracha (1934), the first live-action short film made in three-strip Technicolor.

She made her film debut in The Indiscretions of Eve (1932) in the starring role (along with Jessica Tandy, also making her debut). Signed by RKO Radio Pictures, she played Guninana, the Eskimo wife of Francis Lederer, in Man of Two Worlds (1934).

Lederer had performed with Duna in the Berlin, Germany production of Die Wunderbar. In 1936, she played Nedda in the British film version of Pagliacci, starring Richard Tauber. Films in which she played lead roles, such as Panama Lady (1939) with Lucille Ball, were popular but did not make her a major star. Her best remembered films include Anthony Adverse (1936) and Waterloo Bridge (1940).

Personal life and death
Duna was married twice. Her first marriage was in 1935 to actor John Carroll, her co-star in the screen comedy Hi, Gaucho!.  They had one child, a daughter, and divorced in 1938. In 1940 Duna married actor Dennis O'Keefe, and they had a son.

Duna died in May 1992 of cancer at her home in Beverly Hills.

Partial filmography

 The Indiscretions of Eve (1932) - Eve
 The Iron Stair (1933) - Elsa Damond
 Man of Two Worlds (1934) - Guninana
 La Cucaracha (1934, Short) - Chaquita
 Red Morning (1934) - Kara Perava
 One New York Night (1935) - Countess Louise Broussiloff
 Hi, Gaucho! (1935) - Inez del Campo
 La Fiesta de Santa Barbara (1935, Short) - Herself
 I Conquer the Sea! (1936) - Rosita Gonzales
 Dancing Pirate (1936) - Serafina Perena
 Anthony Adverse (1936) - Neleta
 Pagliacci (1936) - Nedda Salvatini
 Escape by Night (1937) - Josephine 'Jo' Elliott
 Rascals (1938) - Stella
 Flirting with Fate (1938) - Carlita
 Panama Lady (1939) - Cheema
 The Girl and the Gambler (1939) - Dolores 'The Dove' Romero
 The Magnificent Fraud (1939) - Carmelita
 Way Down South (1939) - Pauline
 Hitler – Beast of Berlin (1939) - Elsa Memling
 Law of the Pampas (1939) - Chiquita
 The Marines Fly High (1940) - Teresa
 Waterloo Bridge (1940) - Lydia
 Phantom Raiders (1940) - Dolores
 The Great McGinty (1940) - The Dancing Girl
 River's End (1940) - Cheeta
 Girl from Havana (1940) - Chita (final film role)

Sources
Bismarck Tribune, "Steffi Duna Important Character In Picture", Wednesday, November 20, 1935, p. 8.
Hammond Times, "Hollywood", March 16, 1939, p. 35.
Oakland Tribune, "Money-Important In Marriage, Or Is It?", Sunday, November 26, 1939, p. 79.
Salisbury Times, "Dennis O'Keefe Picks That As Official Name", Monday Evening, August 28, 1944, p. 5.

References

External links

 
 
 

1910 births
1992 deaths
Actresses from Budapest
20th-century Hungarian actresses
Hungarian ballerinas
Hungarian film actresses
Hungarian emigrants to the United States
Western (genre) film actresses
Hungarian people of Czech descent